|}

The December Gold Cup (run since 2022 as the Ais December Gold Cup) is a Premier Handicap National Hunt steeplechase in Great Britain which is open to horses aged four years or older. It is run on the New Course at Cheltenham over a distance of about 2 miles and 4½ furlongs (2 miles 4 furlongs and 127 yards, or 4,139 metres), and during its running there are seventeen fences to be jumped. It is a handicap race, and it is scheduled to take place each year in December.

The event was first run in 1963. It was originally sponsored by Massey Ferguson and known as the Massey Ferguson Gold Cup. The race continued with this title until 1980, but since then it has had various sponsors and consequently several title changes. The 2005 running was named the Robin Cook Memorial Gold Cup. This was in memory of Robin Cook (1946–2005), a former Foreign Secretary who was a keen racing enthusiast. Boylesports supported the race from 2006 to 2009 as the Boylesports.com Gold Cup. The 2010 race was run as the Vote A P Gold Cup as part of a successful campaign to encourage racegoers to vote for Tony McCoy in the BBC Sports Personality of the Year award. In 2011 the racehorse owner Andy Stewart began backing the race to promote the Spinal Research charity, following a spinal injury suffered by his son Paul in 2008. The race was run as the Spinal Research The Atlantic 4 Gold Cup in 2011, the Paul Stewart IronSpine Charity Challenge Gold Cup in 2012 and was then named the Stewart Family Thank You Gold Cup in 2013. From 2014 to 2020 the was run as the Caspian Caviar Gold Cup and in 2021 it was titled the Racing Post Gold Cup. The race has become commonly known in the racing media as the December Gold Cup. and in 2022 Ais took over sponsorship and the word December appeared in the official race title. The race was give Grade 3 status when the National Hunt Pattern was revised in 1989 and was re-classified as a Premier Handicap from the 2022 running when Grade 3 status was renamed by the BHA.

The race is often contested by horses which ran previously in the Paddy Power Gold Cup (also formerly known by other titles). Three have won both races in the same season – Pegwell Bay, Senor El Betrutti and Exotic Dancer.

Records
Most successful horse (2 wins) :
 Poquelin – (2009),(2010)
 Frodon - (2016, 2018)

Leading jockey (3 wins):
 Richard Johnson – Legal Right (1999), Monkerhostin (2004) Village Vic (2015)

Leading trainer (5 wins):
 Paul Nicholls – Poquelin (2009, 2010), Unioniste (2012), Frodon (2016, 2018)

Winners
 Weights given in stones and pounds.

See also
 Horse racing in Great Britain
 List of British National Hunt races

References

 Racing Post:
 pedigreequery.com – Boylesports.com Gold Cup Chase – Cheltenham.

External links
 Race Recordings 1979 – 2003 

National Hunt races in Great Britain
Cheltenham Racecourse
National Hunt chases
Recurring sporting events established in 1963
1963 establishments in England